Welsford is a community in the Canadian province of Nova Scotia, located in  Pictou County.

It is named after Captain Welsford who died a hero in the Crimean War and was commemorated with the Welsford-Parker Monument.

References
 Welsford on Destination Nova Scotia

Communities in Pictou County
General Service Areas in Nova Scotia